PS Anglia was a paddle steamer passenger vessel operated by the Chester and Holyhead Railway from 1847 to 1859 and the London and North Western Railway from 1859 to 1861.

History

She was built by Ditchburn and Mare, Blackwall for the Chester and Holyhead Railway, which was taken over by the London and North Western Railway in 1859.

She was sold in 1861 and used as a blockade runner by the Confederate States of America. Captured in 1862 by the Union and renamed Admiral Dupont after Admiral Samuel Francis Du Pont

On 7 June 1865 she left New York City for Fortress Monroe with a detachment of United States troops. On 8 June 1865 at 4.20am, she collided with a sailing vessel, the Stadaconda (or Studaconda), and was sunk in about three minutes.

References

1847 ships
Passenger ships of the United Kingdom
Steamships of the United Kingdom
Ships built in Leamouth
Ships of the London and North Western Railway
Captured ships
Paddle steamers of the United Kingdom
Maritime incidents in June 1865
Ships of the Confederate States of America
Merchant ships of the United States
Steamships of the United States